Power of the Pen is an interscholastic writing league founded by Lorraine B. Merrill in 1986. It is a non-profit creative writing program for students in grades seven and eight in the U.S. state of Ohio.

Participation
Power of the Pen is exclusive to the state of Ohio, having no competition at a national level. More than 200 school districts compete, each starting off with teams of twelve students, six from each grade. In 2022, the competition was described as involving 200 children from 19 schools.

Qualification and Tournaments
In most schools, students who want to join the Power of the Pen team participate in one or more tryout sessions, in which they are given a prompt that they must base an essay or short story within 40 minutes. After the allotted time, each story is given to the coach, who evaluates the writing and chooses students who they think are best for the team based on their writing skills.

The teams compete in three different tournaments: a District, Regional, and State tournament. As the team progresses, more and more members may be eliminated based on their scores in the previous tournament's submissions.

References

External links
Official website
History of the program

Power of the Pen